Wireless local loop (WLL), is the use of a wireless communications link as the "last mile / first mile" connection for delivering plain old telephone service (POTS) or Internet access (marketed under the term "broadband")  to telecommunications customers. 
Various types of WLL systems and technologies exist.

Other terms for this type of access include broadband wireless access (BWA), radio in the loop (RITL), fixed-radio access (FRA), fixed wireless access (FWA) and metro wireless (MW).

Definition of fixed wireless service 
Fixed wireless terminal (FWT) units differ from conventional mobile terminal units operating within cellular networks such as GSM in that a fixed wireless terminal or desk phone will be limited to an almost permanent location with almost no roaming abilities.

WLL and FWT are generic terms for radio-based telecommunications technologies and the respective devices, which can be implemented using a number of different wireless and radio technologies.

Wireless local-loop services are segmented into a number of broad market and deployment groups. Services are split between licensed commonly used by carriers and telcos and unlicensed services more commonly deployed by home users and wireless ISPs (WISPs).

Licensed Point-to-Point Microwave 
Licensed point-to-point microwave was first deployed by AT&T Long Lines in the 1960s for high-bandwidth, interstate transmission of voice, data and television. AT&T's network covered the entire U.S., carried across hundreds of microwave towers, largely transmitting at 3700–4200 MHz and 5000–6200 MHz. The network was slowly obsoleted, starting in the late 1980's, as fiber optics became the solution of choice for communications backhaul.

Following the Breakup of the Bell System on January 8, 1982, licensed point-to-point microwave solutions could be sold to enterprise and government accounts for their own private use. Often the justification was to backup vulnerable copper lines or bypass wired local loops for cost savings.

In 1987, Microwave Bypass modified a high-frequency licensed microwave radio (23GHz) and developed the first 802.3 wireless interface, dubbed the EtherWave Transceiver. The result was the first (FCC licensed) point-to-point microwave radio capable of delivering 10 Mbps Ethernet, full-duplex, between local and remote networks up to 4.3 miles apart. Distance limitation had more to do with 802.3 Ethernet latency than microwave range. Later, in 1988 Microwave Bypass teamed up with Cisco to create an end-to-end full-duplex connection that doubled the distance of the previous 4.3 mile limitation.

Then, the point-to-point microwave solution was referred to as, "LAN extension over microwave", thereafter, "wireless backhaul," and it was exclusively deployed for enterprise and government clients.

In the 1990s, point-to-point microwave flourished under the growth of cell towers. This growth spurred research in this area, and as the cost continues to decline, it is being used as an alternative to T-1, T-3, and fiber connectivity.

Following the release of wi-fi IEEE 802.11, licensed point-to-point microwave became an addition tool for wireless internet service providers (WISP) and ISPs to close the Digital divide.

In 2017, a company called Climate Resilient Internet, LLC, formed to develop a new standard and certification for point-to-point microwave ("fixed wireless") for enterprise and government resilience to extreme weather, grid outages and terror attacks. The company was co-founded by David Theodore, founder of Microwave Bypass, who pioneered the first use of point-to-point microwave for internet access.

Licensed point-to-multipoint microwave services 
Multipoint microwave licenses are generally more expensive than point-to-point licenses. A single point-to-point system could be installed and licensed for US$50,000 to US$200,000. A multipoint license would start in the millions of dollars. Multichannel multipoint distribution service (MMDS) and local multipoint distribution service (LMDS) were the first true multipoint services for wireless local loop. While Europe and the rest of the world developed the 3500 MHz band for affordable broadband fixed wireless, the U.S. provided LMDS and MMDS, and most implementations in the United States were conducted at 2500 MHz. The largest was Sprint Broadband's deployment of hybrid networks equipment. Sprint was plagued with difficulties operating the network profitably, and service was often spotty, due to inadequate radio link quality.

Unlicensed multi point wireless service 

Most of the growth in long-range radio communications since 2002 has been in the license-free bands (mostly 900 MHz, 2.4 GHz and 5.8 GHz). Global Pacific Internet and Innetix started wireless service in California in 1995 using Breezecom (Alvarion) frequency-hopping radio, which later became the standard 802.11.

A few years later NextWeb Networks of Fremont began deploying reliable license-free service. For Nextweb they originally deployed 802.11b equipment and later switched to Axxcelera, which uses propriety protocol.

1995–2004: License-free equipment 
Most of the early vendors of license-free fixed wireless equipment such as Adaptive Broadband (Axxcelera), Trango Broadband, Motorola (Orthogon), Proxim Networks, Redline Communications and BreezeCom (Alvarion) used proprietary protocols and hardware, creating pressure on the industry to adopt a standard for unlicensed fixed wireless. These MAC layers typically used a 15–20 MHz channel using direct-sequence spread spectrum and BPSK, CCK and QPSK for modulation.

These devices all describe the customer premises wireless system as the subscriber unit (SU), and the operator transmitter delivering the last mile local loop services as the access point (AP). 802.11 uses the terms AP and STA (station).

2002–2005: Wi-Fi local loop 
Originally designed for short-range mobile internet and local area network access, IEEE 802.11 has emerged as the de facto standard for unlicensed wireless local loop. More 802.11 equipment is deployed for long-range data service than any other technology. These systems have provided varying results, as the operators were often small and poorly trained in radio communications, additionally 802.11 was not intended to be used at long ranges and suffered from a number of problems, such as the hidden node problem. Many companies such as KarlNet began modifying the 802.11 MAC to attempt to deliver higher performance at long ranges.

2005–present: Maturation of the wireless ISP market 
In nearly every metropolitan area worldwide, operators and hobbyists deployed more and more unlicensed broadband point-to-multipoint systems. Providers that had rave reviews when they started faced the prospect of seeing their networks degrade in performance, as more and more devices were deployed using the license-free U-NII (5.3/5.4 GHz) and ISM (2.4 and 5.8 GHz) bands and competitors sprung up around them.

The growing interference problem 
Interference caused the majority of unlicensed wireless services to have much higher error rates and interruptions than equivalent wired or licensed wireless networks, such as the copper telephone network and the coaxial-cable network. This caused growth to slow, customers to cancel, and many operators to rethink their business model.

There were several responses to these problems.

2003: Voluntary frequency coordination (USA)
Next-Web, Etheric Networks, Gate Speed and a handful of other companies founded the first voluntary spectrum coordination, working entirely independently of government regulators. This organization was founded in March 2003 as BANC, "Bay Area Network Coordination". By maintaining frequencies used in an inter-operator database, disruptions between coordinating parties were minimized, as well as the cost of identifying new or changing transmission sources, by using the frequency database to determine what bands were in use. Because the parties in BANC comprised the majority of operators in the Bay Area, they used peer pressure to imply that operators who did not play nice would be collectively punished by the group, through interfering with the non-cooperative, while striving not to interfere with the cooperative. BANC was then deployed in Los Angeles. Companies such as Deutsche Telekom joined. It looked like the idea had promise.

2005: Operators flee unlicensed for licensed 
The better capitalized operators began reducing their focus on unlicensed and instead focused on licensed systems, as the constant fluctuations in signal quality caused them to have very high maintenance costs. NextWeb, acquired by Covad for a very small premium over the capital invested in it, is one operator who focused on licensed service, as did WiLine Networks. This led to fewer of the more responsible and significant operators actually using the BANC system. Without its founders active involvement, the system languished.

2005 to present: Adaptive network technology 
Operators began to apply the principles of self-healing networks. Etheric Networks followed this path. Etheric Networks focused on improving performance by developing dynamic interference and fault detection and reconfiguration, as well as optimizing quality based routing software, such as MANET and using multiple paths to deliver service to customers. This approach is generally called "mesh networking", which relies on ad hoc networking protocols, however, mesh and ad hoc networking protocols have yet to deliver high-speed low-latency business-class end-to-end reliable local-loop service, as the paths can sometimes traverse exponentially more radio links than a traditional star (AP → SU) topology.

Adaptive network management actively monitors the local-loop quality and behaviour, using automation to reconfigure the network and its traffic flows, to avoid interference and other failures.

Mobile technologies 
These include Global System for Mobile Communications (GSM), time-division multiple access (TDMA), code-division multiple access (CDMA), and Digital Enhanced Cordless Telecommunications (DECT). Earlier implementations included such technologies as Advanced Mobile Phone System (AMPS).

Deployment 

The wireless local loop market is currently an extremely high-growth market, offering Internet service providers immediate access to customer markets without having to either lay cable through a metropolitan area, or work through the ILECs, reselling the telephone, cable or satellite networks, owned by companies that prefer to largely sell direct.

This trend revived the prospects for local and regional ISPs, as those willing to deploy fixed wireless networks were not at the mercy of the large telecommunication monopolies. They were at the mercy of unregulated re-use of unlicensed frequencies upon which they communicate.

Due to the enormous quantity of 802.11 "Wi-Fi" equipment and software, coupled with the fact that spectrum licenses are not required in the ISM and U-NII bands, the industry has moved well ahead of the regulators and the standards bodies.

WLL methods 
 Mobile:
 CDMA (USA).
 TDMA (USA).
 GSM (ITU – Worldwide).
 UMTS 3rd Generation (World).
 Personal Handy-phone System (PHS in Japan, PAS/Xiaolingtong in China)
 Fixed or local area network:
 DECT, for local loop
 LMDS
 IEEE 802.11, originally designed for short-range mobile Internet and network access service, it has emerged as the facto standard for wireless local loop.
 WiMAX or IEEE 802.16 may become the dominant medium for wireless local loop. Currently more operators are running on the 802.11 MAC at 2 and 5 GHz. 802.16 was unlikely to outperform 802.11 until at least late 2008. Intel is promoting this standard, while Atheros and Broadcom are still focused largely on 802.11.
 Satellite Internet access for autonomous building.

Manufacturers 
 Huawei
 Airspan
 Alvarion
 Axxcelera
 Cambridge Broadband
 Intracom Telecom
 P-Com
 Redline Communications
 Sony Ericsson
 SR Telecom

See also 
 8P8C (RJ-45)
 Antenna
 Basic exchange telephone radio service
 Electrical cable
 RF connector
 Wi-Fi
 Microwave Bypass
 Wireless Internet service provider (WISP)

References 

Local loop
Wireless Internet service providers